The Zumbrota Covered Bridge is the last remaining historic covered bridge in the U.S. state of Minnesota. It has been restored and is located in Covered Bridge Park in Zumbrota, Minnesota.

History
The bridge was completed in November 1869 as a replacement for Zumbrota's original bridge which was destroyed by the spring flood of that year. The bridge has latticed wooden-trusses and is structured to look like a barn; it is 116-feet long, and has a 15-feet wide roadway. The covered portion of the bridge was added in 1871. The bridge served until 1932 when it was moved to the fairgrounds.

In 1905, Zumbrota had a bridge often called "Zumbrota's second covered bridge" which spanned the Zumbro River, about  mile upstream. It was a railroad bridge for the Duluth, Red Wing, and Southern Railroad.

The bridge roof partially collapsed on February 24, 2019, following one of the snowiest months in state history.

See also
List of bridges documented by the Historic American Engineering Record in Minnesota
List of Minnesota covered bridges

References

Further reading

External links

Zumbrota Covered Bridge & Park

1869 establishments in Minnesota
Buildings and structures in Goodhue County, Minnesota
Covered bridges on the National Register of Historic Places in Minnesota
Former road bridges in Minnesota
Historic American Engineering Record in Minnesota
National Register of Historic Places in Goodhue County, Minnesota
Relocated buildings and structures in Minnesota
Road bridges on the National Register of Historic Places in Minnesota
Tourist attractions in Goodhue County, Minnesota
Transportation in Goodhue County, Minnesota
Wooden bridges in Minnesota